The Schiller Prize of the City of Marbach, endowed with 10,000 euros, is awarded every two years on 10 November, Friedrich Schiller's birthday, to personalities who are committed to the poet's tradition of thought in their life or work. The prize was first awarded in 1959, on the 200th birthday of Schiller. Up until 2007 it was awarded every two years for outstanding work in the field of regional studies of Württemberg. In the Schiller Year 2009, the award criteria were changed. The award has been given to persons who are committed in their life or work to Schiller's tradition of thought.

Recipients
Source:

 1959: Walter Grube
 1961: Werner Fleischhauer
 1963: Ruthardt Oehme
 1965: Georg Wagner and Adolf Koch
 1967: Hansmartin Decker-Hauff
 1969: Paul Gehring
 1971: Hans Jänichen
 1973: Adolf Beck
 1975: Max Schefold
 1977: Paul Sauer
 1979: Robert Uhland
 1981: Wolfgang Binder
 1983: Rainer Christlein
 1985: Dorothea Kuhn
 1987: Paul Feuchte
 1989: Gerhard Schäfer
 1991: Volkmar Wirth
 1993: Renate Neumüllers-Klauser
 1995: Norbert Oellers
 1997: Ulrike Gauss and Christian von Holst
 1999: Lutz Reichardt
 2001: Bernhard Zeller
 2003: Horst Carl
 2005: Peter-André Alt
 2007: 
 2009: Jens Reich
 2011: Simone Veil
 2013: 
 2015: Andrea Breth
 2017: Horst Bredekamp
 2019: Christiane Nüsslein-Volhard
 2021: Saša Stanišić

References

External links
 

Awards established in 1959
German awards
1959 establishments in Germany